Rena Wang (born August 15, 1991) is an American badminton player. She was invited by the Badminton World Federation to compete at the 2012 Olympics in the women’s singles event. Her sister, Iris Wang, is also a badminton player and her doubles partner. Rena Wang won bronze in the women’s singles and women’s doubles events with her sister at the 2009 Pan Am Badminton Championships at Guadalajara, Mexico.

School life
Rena Wang graduated from UCLA in 2014, with summa cum laude honors in the physiological sciences department.

References

External links
 Team USA: Rena Wang

American female badminton players
American sportspeople of Chinese descent
1991 births
Living people
Badminton players at the 2012 Summer Olympics
Olympic badminton players of the United States
American sportswomen of Chinese descent
Badminton players at the 2011 Pan American Games
Pan American Games medalists in badminton
Pan American Games silver medalists for the United States
Medalists at the 2011 Pan American Games
21st-century American women